Lilaeopsis chinensis, common names eastern grasswort, eastern lilaeopsis, and lilaeopsis, is a plant that is native to North America.

Conservation status
It is listed as threatened in Maine, New Hampshire, and New York, as a special concern in Connecticut, and as having a historic range in Rhode Island.

References

chinensis
Flora of North America
Plants described in 1753
Taxa named by Carl Linnaeus